Taractrocera flavoides is a butterfly of the family Hesperiidae. It is only known from the Chinese provinces of Sichuan (and neighbouring Tibet) and Yunnan.

External links
Phylogeny and biogeography of the genus Taractrocera Butler, 1870 (Lepidoptera: Hesperiidae), an example of Southeast Asian-Australian interchange

Taractrocerini
Butterflies described in 1894